The Aquincum Museum is a museum in Budapest, Hungary. It first opened in May 1894.  Archeological findings from the remains of Aquincum are on display there. These include items from the local mithraeum. It has an indoor and outdoor part.

Paula Zsidi served as the museum director from 1989 until 2015.

References

External links
 

Museums in Budapest
Archaeological museums
Museums of ancient Rome in Hungary
Museums established in 1894
1894 establishments in Hungary